John Dean ( 1620 -  23 February 1629) was an 8- or 9-year-old English boy who was hanged under the reign of Charles I. He is likely the youngest person ever to be executed in England. Dean was accused of setting fire to two barns or houses in the nearby town of Windsor, and was subsequently indicted, arraigned, and convicted on the same day, and was "hanged accordingly". It is unknown if anyone was harmed in the alleged acts of arson, but the judge presiding Dean's conviction said that Dean showed signs of "malice, revenge, craft, and cunning". The evidence for Dean's guilt in the alleged crimes has never been recovered. Even for the time, it was unusual and frowned upon by society in England for minors to be executed, but Dean was nevertheless sentenced to death and executed soon after.

See also
 Capital punishment in the United Kingdom
 Alice Glaston, 11-year old girl who was the youngest girl executed in the history of England
 Hannah Ocuish
 Mary (slave)

Notes

References

1620s births
1629 deaths
Date of birth unknown
Year of birth unknown
17th-century executions by England
Executed children